is a retired Japanese footballer who played for Fukushima United as a midfielder.

Club statistics
Updated to 23 December 2018.

References

External links 

 Profile at Fukushima United FC 

1982 births
Living people
Teikyo University alumni
Association football people from Saitama Prefecture
Japanese footballers
J3 League players
Japan Football League players
AC Nagano Parceiro players
Matsumoto Yamaga FC players
FC Machida Zelvia players
Fukushima United FC players
Association football midfielders